Jonathan Garth may refer to:
 Jonathan Garth (cricketer, born 1965), Irish cricketer
 Jonathan Garth (cricketer, born 2000), his son, Irish cricketer
 Jonathan Garth (rugby league), Irish rugby league player